Martin Amerhauser (born 23 July 1974) is an Austrian former professional footballer who played as a midfielder.

Club career
A leftsided midfielder renowned for his accurate crossing, Amerhauser only played for SV Salzburg and Grazer AK in the Austrian Bundesliga. Regarded as one of Austria's biggest talents in the early 1990s, he never really lived up to his potential but he did win major silverware with Salzburg and Graz.

In his first season, Amerhauser scored the decisive 3–0 in probably the best game Stadion Lehen has ever seen against Sporting CP in the UEFA Cup. Only 19 years of age, he went on to play in both legs of the Final which they lost to Inter Milan.

In 2007, he experienced a career low with the demotion of GAK to the Regionalliga Mitte because of financial difficulties.

International career
Amerhauser made his debut for Austria in a March 1998 friendly match against Hungary in which he immediately scored his first international goal. He then was a participant at the 1998 FIFA World Cup but did not play. His last international was a September 2005 World Cup qualifying match against Azerbaijan.

Honours
SV Austria Salzburg
 Austrian Bundesliga: 1993–94, 1996–97

Grazer AK
 Austrian Bundesliga: 2003–04
 Austrian Cup: 1999–2000, 2001–02, 2003–04

External links

References

1974 births
Living people
Footballers from Salzburg
Austrian footballers
Association football midfielders
Austria international footballers
1998 FIFA World Cup players
Austrian Football Bundesliga players
FC Red Bull Salzburg players
Grazer AK players